Interstate 84 (I-84) is an east–west Interstate Highway across the state of Connecticut through Danbury, Waterbury, Hartford, and Union.

Route description

I-84 enters Danbury from the town of Southeast, New York, and is designated the Yankee Expressway for the next . About  to the east, US Route 7 (US 7) joins from the south at exit 3 near Danbury Fair as I-84 turns north. At the next exit, US 6 and US 202 join to form a four-way concurrency for the next  to exit 7, when US 7 and US 202 split off north toward New Milford. US 6 leaves the Interstate at the following exit, as I-84 climbs away from Danbury into the more rural towns of Bethel and Brookfield.

US 6 rejoins I-84 at exit 10, and, at exit 11, it turns to the northeast and descends to cross the Housatonic River on the Rochambeau Bridge, into New Haven County. After US 6 leaves once again at exit 15 in Southbury, I-84 proceeds through hilly terrain into Middlebury, becoming more of an urban freeway as it enters the city of Waterbury, where it intersects the Route 8 expressway and crosses the Naugatuck River on an elevated dual-decked viaduct known locally as the Mixmaster. After passing through Cheshire, I-84 intersects the western end of I-691 at the Cheshire–Southington town line, which is also the New Haven–Hartford county line.

I-84 turns more northerly for a stretch to exit 31 (Route 229), which provides access to Lake Compounce and ESPN World Headquarters. The freeway heads more northeasterly to Plainville, where it has a brief  concurrency with Route 72 to the New Britain city line. From the Route 72 junction through Farmington, West Hartford, and into Hartford, I-84 has many left-hand exits and entrances and sharp curves, which were built for a planned network of freeways. In Farmington, US6  joins I-84 once again at exit 38 and both meet the northern end of the Route 9 expressway at a half-used multilevel stack interchange that was originally planned to be part of the mostly-canceled I-291 Hartford Beltway. I-84 and US 6 pass through West Hartford into Hartford (the largest city along the length of the eastern I-84) where they intersect I-91, just before US 44 briefly joins to cross the Connecticut River into East Hartford on the Bulkeley Bridge, which is the oldest bridge on the Interstate System.

After the bridge, US 44 leaves, the name of the highway changes to the Lieutenant Brian L. Aselton Memorial Highway, and I-84 meets the Route 2 expressway, which provides access to the southeastern suburbs of Hartford. As I-84 passes the northern end of the Route 15 expressway, it inherits the Wilbur Cross Highway name for the rest of its length. From 1968 until 1984, the I-84 designation ended here, and the highway became I-86 for the rest of its length, as I-84 was once planned to be built east toward Providence, Rhode Island. I-84 intersects one of the remnants of the abandoned project, I-384, as part of a  series of complex interchanges in Manchester including the end of the US 6 concurrency at exit 60, and a connection to the only built as originally planned portion of I-291 at exit 61.

Beyond Manchester, I-84 climbs steadily from the Connecticut River Valley and passes through the Tolland County towns of Vernon, Tolland, and Willington. After briefly entering the Windham County town of Ashford, it reenters Tolland County in the town of Union.  After exit 74 (Route 171), I-84 crosses the Massachusetts state line. All lanes eventually enter into Sturbridge, but the westbound lanes pass briefly through the town of Holland before entering Sturbridge.  later, I-84 reaches its eastern terminus at the Massachusetts Turnpike (I-90).

History

New York to Hartford
I-84 opened in stages from the New York State Line in Danbury starting in 1961, finally connecting to Hartford in 1969. In Hartford, it crossed the Bulkeley Bridge and continued along the existing Wilbur Cross Highway to Massachusetts. This western segment was briefly redesignated I-86.

1970s route east of Hartford

A highway connecting Hartford and Providence was first brought up in 1944 as an upgrade to US 6 from Manchester to the Rhode Island state line. The plan eventually adapted to a submission to the 1956 Interstate Highway Plan but was declined.

The highway was firstly designated as Interstate 82 (I-82) but was changed shortly after to its well-known designation, Interstate 84 (I-84). In 1970 through 1973, the first segments of the highway started construction, the segment now designated as I-384, and the Willimantic Bypass. When these isolated segments were completed, they were designated for the future Interstate, starkly different from today's signs. The signs remained on the Willimantic Bypass up to a decade after the cancellation of the project.

The planned I-84 was going to also incorporate a cloverleaf intersection with I-295 in Johnston, Rhode Island, and use the under-construction Dennis J. Roberts Expressway and built Huntington Expressway to Providence before the project was shelved. Briefly, there was an idea to use the southern/unused portion of the highway for Interstate 184 (I-184) but was disapproved by the FHA.

An environmental study by the Rhode Island Department of Transportation (RIDOT) was done in 1972; it was found the highway would cause heavy impact to Scituate Reservoir, the main drinking supply for Providence. After conducting multiple other studies, including briefly considering an alternate southern alignment that would bypass the Scituate Reservoir to the south and connected I-84 to the Route 37 Expressway, Rhode Island ended up canceling their segment of the highway in 1982, which ended up causing Connecticut to cut the segment to I-395 in Plainfield. Without Rhode Island, the highway was fully canceled in 1983, and the mileage was returned for other projects.

After the highway was canceled, the only inland route to Providence from Hartford was either US 44 or US 6. Many projects have since happened to improve the roads, mainly in Connecticut. One major one was improving the "Suicide 6" area of US 6 between Bolton and Columbia. Since the cancelation, other plans to have a freeway link between the two built segments have been proposed, including one in 2001, but was short lived, only lasting to 2003 before becoming dormant.

In the 1992 long-range transportation plan released by RIDOT, a freeway has been added along the original route of I-84 that will connect to the Route 695 freeway on the Rhode Island–Connecticut border.

I-86 relation

The section of I-84 between East Hartford, Connecticut, (at the present-day junction with I-384) and Sturbridge, Massachusetts, (I-90) was for a time signed as I-86 (unrelated to present-day I-86 in New York and Pennsylvania). Signs stating "I-84 Ends, I-86 to Boston" (eastbound) and "I-86 Ends, I-84 to Hartford" (westbound) were posted where the change took place. Exit numbering on I-86 was that of the road's predecessor, Route 15, in a sequence beginning on New York's Hutchinson River Parkway. Exits were renumbered to correspond with the rest of I-84 in Connecticut when the road was redesignated in 1984. The present I-384 as well as the present US 6 bypass near Willimantic, both of which were a part of what was then I-84's planned easterly continuation, were also numbered I-84 prior to 1984 even though they lacked any direct connection to the rest of I-84 at that time. (One had to use Silver Lane in East Hartford to travel between the two stretches of the highway.) These two sections were renumbered. The western segment became I-384, and the eastern one became part of US 6 when what was then I-86 was renumbered I-84.

Upgrades

Sections of I-84 in Connecticut were reconstructed and widened from the mid 1970s into the mid 1980s.  Another section through Danbury was widened from four lanes to six lanes in 1985 and 1986. Widening of the highway through Danbury was funded by Union Carbide as part of building its world headquarters in Danbury. From roughly 1976 to 1988 the former I-86 portion from East Hartford to the Massachusetts state line was completely rebuilt from a narrow four-lane parkway to a much wider profile ranging from six lanes at the Massachusetts state line, expanding to eight lanes in Vernon, to 12 lanes with high-occupancy vehicle lanes (HOV lanes) in East Hartford. The original route, then known as Route 15, featured pit latrines at its pull-offs or rest areas. As of 2014, planning is underway for the I-84 Hartford Project to replace and possibly redesign a  stretch of mostly elevated highway in Hartford. On April 22, 2015, construction began on widening the highway from exit 23 to exit 25A in Waterbury from four lanes to six lanes.

A widening project along the congested stretch of I-84 through Waterbury and Cheshire has been beset by cost overruns, delays, and construction defects involving storm drains, as state and federal officials have launched criminal investigations stemming from this project. This episode has waned local enthusiasm for a proposed $2-billion reconstruction of the Mixmaster interchange in downtown Waterbury. Cost estimates for the Mixmaster replacement have increased to $3 billion. Connecticut Attorney-General Richard Blumenthal has begun a lawsuit against the contractor and an engineering firm in response to threats from the US Department of Transportation (USDOT) to withhold funds from the project. On May 18, 2007, the Republican-American reported this area had defective light poles, while Governor Jodi Rell released an audit report of the construction disaster.

Future
The I-84 Hartford Project is a Connecticut Department of Transportation (CTDOT) project to address structural deficiencies within the I-84 corridor approximately between Flatbush Avenue (exit 45) and the I-91 interchange in Hartford, including a  elevated section known as the Aetna Viaduct. Since it became apparent in the 1980s that this section of I-84 in Hartford was deteriorating, CTDOT has considered how best to repair or reconstruct the corridor. Since that time, many inspections have been carried out and frequent repairs made to keep the highway safe and functioning.

In 2010, the Capitol Region Council of Governments (CRCOG), the City of Hartford, and CTDOT collaborated on a study of the corridor to begin the process of exploring reconstruction options. That study looked at several concepts, including the rebuilding of the viaduct "in-kind", as well as several reconstruction alternatives that would alter the configuration of the highway. The alternatives developed for that study were conceptual in nature—they did not look in depth at traffic, engineering feasibility, or environmental impact. However, the strong stakeholder input as part of that effort was helpful in leading to CTDOT's decision to initiate the I-84 Hartford Project, to build on the good work of that earlier study. The I-84 Hartford Project will be a full and comprehensive evaluation leading to a workable solution. The I-84 Hartford Project will examine the feasibility and assess the impact of a range of concepts. Following full examination of the impacts and benefits of feasible alternatives, and, in collaboration with stakeholders and the public, CTDOT will make a final decision on how to reconstruct this section of the I-84 corridor.

Exit list

Auxiliary routes

References

External links

84
 Connecticut
Transportation in Fairfield County, Connecticut
Transportation in New Haven County, Connecticut
Transportation in Hartford County, Connecticut
Transportation in Tolland County, Connecticut
Transportation in Windham County, Connecticut